Gorton is district in the city of Manchester, England.

Gorton may also refer to:

People
See Gorton (surname)

Places in England
Gorton, district in the City of Manchester, England
Gorton North, government ward in the Gorton area
Gorton South, government ward in the Gorton area
Manchester Gorton (UK Parliament constituency)
Gorton railway station, Manchester
Gorton Monastery

Other
Gorton, Pennsylvania, a place in Pennsylvania, United States
Gorton railway station (West Highland Line), Argyll and Bute council area, Scotland
Gorton High School, New York, United States
Gorton Township, Minnesota. United States
Division of Gorton, a federal electoral division in the state of Victoria, Australia
Mount Gorton, Antarctica
Gorton's of Gloucester, seafood market, Gloucester, Massachusetts, United States
Cretons, a pork-based spread sometimes called gorton